Kuvagam is a village in the Udayarpalayam taluk of Ariyalur district, Tamil Nadu, India.

Demographics 

 census, Kuvagam had a total population of 5492 with 2733 males and 2759 females.

References 

Villages in Ariyalur district